Presidential elections were held in South Korea on 18 December 1997. The result was a victory for opposition candidate Kim Dae-jung, who won with 40.3 percent of the vote. When he took office in 1998, it marked the first time in Korean history that the ruling party peacefully transferred power to the opposition party.

Nominations

National Congress for New Politics 
The NCNP National Convention was held on 19 May at Olympic Gymnastics Arena. Kim Dae-jung, a former 6-term lawmaker from South Jeolla, was nominated for president, defeating Chyung Dai-chul, a former four-term lawmaker from Seoul.

New Korea Party 
The ruling New Korea Party's presidential nominating convention took place on 21 July at Olympic Gymnastics Arena, during which former Prime Minister Lee Hoi-chang defeated former Gyeonggi governor Lee In-je after two rounds of voting and became the party's nominee.

United Liberal Democrats 
The ULD National Convention held on 24 June at Olympic Gymnastics Arena overwhelmingly nominated 8-term lawmaker Kim Jong-pil from South Chungcheong for president.

Democratic Party 
On 11 September, the Democratic Party, once the premier opposition to the New Koreans but a fringe party ever since the defection of Kim Dae-jung's faction in 1995, nominated Seoul mayor Cho Soon for president.

New National Party 
On 4 November, former NKP politicians unhappy with Lee Hoi-chang founded the New National Party and nominated Lee In-je for president. This was after the scandal regarding Lee Hoi-chang's sons being excused from the military service hit the news cycle and brought Lee's popularity down.

Campaign
Early polls showed Lee Hoi-chang leading Kim Dae-jung by as much as 30 percentage points.

Lee Hoi-chang's lead was lost when press reports emerged that Lee’s two sons had evaded military conscription by shedding weight before their physical examinations. The South Korean public tends to be intolerant towards men who attempt to evade mandatory military service or receive special treatment. Lee In-je then launched his own bid for the presidency, claiming that Lee Hoi-chang could not win the election and stood for a generational shift in South Korean politics as he was 20 years younger than any candidate in the race. These developments led to Kim leading in the polls by a slender margin.

The election also took place in the context of the IMF crisis where South Korea was forced to accept an IMF bailout on 3 December amidst an economic crash.

Kim Dae-jung and Kim Jong-pil form an alliance
Kim Dae-jung, or "D.J." and Kim Jong-pil, or "J.P." agreed on 3 November to form an alliance against their common enemy, Lee Hoi-chang. In this agreement, JP announced to withdraw his bid for president to endorse DJ, and in turn DJ would appoint JP as the prime minister once elected president. The two Kims also agreed to revise the Constitution after the election from presidential system to parliamentary system, and the NCNP and ULD would cooperate on different issues as a coalition government. Kim Dae-jung shocked his supporters with this move as Kim Jong-pil prominently served as prime minister under the Park Chung-hee authoritarian regime of the 1960s and 70s to join his ticket even though Kim was targeted by the Park regime as a political dissident, surviving government assassination attempts and imprisonment.

Anti-Kim Coalition: the Grand National Party
On the other hand, needing a breakthrough as Kim Dae-jung's popularity soared, Lee Hoi-chang and Cho Soon also agreed to combine forces. On 21 November, the New Korea Party and Democratic Party merged into one party, and was founded as the Grand National Party. Cho Soon was made the chairman of the party, and Lee Hoi-chang the candidate for president.

The election was also the first to feature election debates between the candidates.

Results
With a winning margin of 1.52%, the 1997 presidential elections were the closest until the 2022 presidential elections.

By region

See also
X-file scandal

References 

Presidential elections in South Korea
Presidential election
South Korea